Starfighter Pilot is the debut EP from Snow Patrol, on the Electric Honey label, released on 15 June 1997. The EP was released under the name Polarbear, the band's second name after Shrug. The name Polarbear was later changed to Snow Patrol because the band had discovered the existence of another group with that name.

Information
The song "Starfighter Pilot" was later featured on the band's debut album, Songs for Polarbears, and was later released as the fourth and final single from the album.

The EP remains a rare find and is popular among collectors. The song "Holy Cow" later appeared as a bonus track on the U.S. release of "Songs for Polarbears". The song "Safety" though, has not been released anywhere else, nor has the EP been re-issued.

Track listing
"Starfighter Pilot" - 3:21
"Holy Cow" - 1:54
"Safety" - 3:06

Personnel
Polarbear
Gary Lightbody - vocals, guitar
Mark McClelland - bass guitar, keyboards
Other personnel

Richard Colburn - drums, keyboards
Stuart Murdoch - vocals, wooden flute, piano on track 3
Jamie Watson - producer, engineer

David McClelland - photography
Ross Wilson - photography
Divine Inc. - artwork

References

1997 EPs
Snow Patrol EPs
Electric Honey (label) EPs